The following lists represent the highest-grossing films in Romania. This lists only accounts for the films' theatrical box office earning and not their ancillary revenues (i.e. home video rental and sales and television broadcast).

In 2009 there was a significant increase in the Romanian box office due to rising of inflation, the appearance of new theaters in several cities of the country and a higher effort in promoting the films. In April 2014, Cinema City International, who is the main cinema operator in Romania, plans 22 new cinema openings in Romania between 2014 and 2016.

Romania's highest-grossing films

The most represented year on the list is 2019, with 9 films. Titanic is the first film in Romania to surpass the 1 million lei mark, Avatar is the first film to surpass the 10 and 20 million lei mark, and Avatar: The Way of Water is the first film to surpass the 30 million lei mark.

Highest grossing films by admissions 

This is a list by Romania's National Center for Cinematography sorted by the highest ticket sales and adjusted gross as of 2021 with the average ticket price of 21.71.

Highest weekend gross 

This list is ranked only in Romanian Lei. Ice Age: Dawn of the Dinosaurs is the first film to gross over 1 million lei in a weekend, The Twilight Saga: Breaking Dawn - Part 2 is the first to gross over 2 million lei in a weekend, The Hobbit: The Battle of the Five Armies is the first to gross over 3 million lei in a weekend and The Fate of the Furious is the first to gross over 4, 5, 6 and 7 million lei in a weekend.

Highest-grossing films by year 

The charts are based on films that premiered on a Romanian release date and not the film's worldwide release date.

Highest-grossing animated films 

This is the list of highest-grossing animated films. Eight of these films are also in the Top 50 Romania's highest-grossing films list. 2016 is the most represented year, with 4 films.

Highest-grossing Romanian films 

This is the list of highest-grossing Romanian films. Child's Pose is the first Romanian film to surpass the 1 million lei mark, Selfie 69 is the first romanian film to surpass the 2 million lei mark, Moromete Family: On the Edge of Time is the first romanian film to surpass the 3 million lei mark, Oh, Ramona! is the first romanian film to surpass the 4 and 5 lei marks, 5Gang: A Different Kind of Christmas is the first romanian film to surpass the 6 million lei mark, and Miami Bici is the first romanian film to surpass the 7, 8, 9 and 10 million lei marks, Teambuilding is the first romanian film to surpass 20 million lei mark. 2019 is the most represented year, with 4 films. Four of this films are in the Top 50 Romania's highest-grossing films.

Timeline of highest-grossing film in Romania

Highest-grossing franchises and film series in Romania 

This is the list of highest-grossing franchises and film series in Romania ranked in Romanian lei. Marvel Cinematic Universe is the highest-grossing franchise, with over 150 million lei. Avatar has the highest per-film average, with over 29 million lei. Fast & Furious, Jumanji, Marvel Cinematic Universe, Spider-Man and Avatar are the only franchises with two films to have crossed the 10 million lei mark. while Avatar is the only franchise with two films to have crossed the 20 million lei mark.

See also

 List of Romanian films
 Cinema of Romania

References

Box office sources

External links 
 http://www.cinemagia.ro/boxoffice/romania

Romania
Lists of Romanian films